Juan Cruz Alli Aranguren (born 21 September 1942) is a Spanish politician and former President of Navarre between 1991 and 1995 and again for a few months in 1996.

References

1942 births
Leaders of political parties in Spain
Living people
Members of the 2nd Parliament of Navarre
Members of the 3rd Parliament of Navarre
Members of the 4th Parliament of Navarre
Members of the 5th Parliament of Navarre
Members of the 6th Parliament of Navarre
Members of the 7th Parliament of Navarre
Navarrese People's Union politicians
Politicians from Navarre
People from Pamplona
Presidents of the Government of Navarre